Shanti Lowry (born Ashanti Misha Lowry; April 2, 1982) is an American actress and dancer. She is best known for her roles as the Treasure Chest Dancer in the 2003 film Charlie's Angels: Full Throttle, and the recurring role as Dionne Taylor on the television series The Game. She is sometimes credited as Shati Lowry.

Career
A graduate of the Rocky Mountain School of Dance, Inc, Shanti moved to Los Angeles in 1999 in order to pursue a career in acting and dancing. Her very first role was in a dancing movie never released in the United States or United Kingdom. Many of her future roles would also incorporate the techniques she took with her from school. Due to her casting in the 2010 film,  Bolden!, Shanti had a very limited role in the third season of  The Game.  Lowry was nominated for a 2019 and a 2020 Daytime Emmy for Outstanding Lead Actress in a Digital Daytime Drama Series for her role as Yolanda Rodriguez on Bronx SIU.

Personal life
Shanti resides in Pasadena, California.

Filmography

Film

Television

References

External links

Living people
1982 births
21st-century American actresses
American female dancers
American dancers
African-American female dancers
African-American dancers
American television actresses
Actresses from Boulder, Colorado
African-American actresses
American film actresses
21st-century African-American women
21st-century African-American people
20th-century African-American people
20th-century African-American women